Tania is usually a given name. It may refer to:

Given name
 Tânia Alves, Brazilian actress and singer
 Tania Brishty, Bangladesh actress and model
 Tania Bambaci (born 1990), Italian actress
 Tania Belvederesi (born 1978), Italian cyclist
 Tania Cagnotto (born 1985), Italian diver
 Tania Marie Caringi (born 1986), Italian-American model
 Princess Tania de Bourbon Parme, French designer
 Tania de Jong, Dutch-born Australian soprano and entrepreneur
 Tania Detomas (born 1985), Italian snowboarder
 Tania Di Mario (born 1979), Italian water polo player
 Tania Emery, British actress
 Tania Gunadi, Indonesian-born actress
 Tania Khalill, Brazilian actress
 Tania Lacy, Australian comedian
 Tania Lineham, New Zealand science teacher
 Tania Libertad, Peruvian singer
 Tania Mak (born 1986), Chinese triathlete 
 Tânia Martins (born 1957), Brazilian poet
 Tania Nehme, Australian film editor
 Tania Raymonde, American actress
 Tania Roxborogh, New Zealand author
 Tania Sachdev, Indian chess player
 Tania Vincenzino (born 1986), Italian long jumper
 Tania Zaetta, Australian Bollywood actress

Single name
 Tamara Bunke a.k.a. "Tania" or "Tania the Guerrillera", a Communist revolutionary who died alongside Che Guevara
 Tania (artist) (1920-1982), artist
 Tania (Indian actress)
 Tania (tango singer) (1893-1999), stage name of Ana Luciano Divis, Spanish tango singer
 Patricia Hearst, who took the alias "Tania" in honor of Tamara Bunke

Fictional characters
 Tania, a fictional character in The Faerie Path
 Tania, a fictional character in Tropic of Cancer

See also
 -tania
 Tanja (name)
 Tanya (name)
 Tonya (name)
 Tonje (name)
 Tonja (name)
 Tonia (name)